Barton is a small locality located northeast of Clarenville.

See also 
 List of communities in Newfoundland and Labrador

Populated places in Newfoundland and Labrador